California Cookin', is a live album by baritone saxophonist Pepper Adams which was recorded in California in 1983 and originally released on the Interplay label in 1991.

Track listing 
All compositions by Pepper Adams except where noted
 "Valse Celtique" – 13:31
 "Summertime" (George Gershwin,  DuBose Heyward) – 9:57
 "Last Resort" (Victor Feldman) – 7:01
 "Now in Our Lives" – 10:27
 "Oleo" (Sonny Rollins) – 9:33
 "Doctor Deep"

Personnel 
Pepper Adams – baritone saxophone
Ted Curson  – trumpet
Victor Feldman – piano
Bob Magnusson – bass
Carl Burnett – drums

References 

Pepper Adams live albums
1991 live albums
Interplay Records live albums